Udong may refer to:

Oudong, a town in Cambodia
U-dong, Haeundae District, Busan, South Korea
Udong (food), a Korean-style udon noodle soup
Odong, a Filipino noodle dish with sardines and tomato sauce